Panagiotis Tachtsidis (born 15 February 1991) is a Greek professional footballer who plays as a midfielder for Emirati club Khor Fakkan.

Club career

AEK Athens
Tachtsidis was scouted by Toni Savevski, the head of AEK Athens's youth academy at the time, and signed his first professional contract with AEK on 1 November 2007. Shortly after signing his first professional contract, Tachtsidis made his debut for AEK in the Greek Cup against Fostiras. On 27 January 2009, he became the youngest player to have ever played for AEK in the Greek League when he played against Thrasyvoulos, being 16 years and 348 days old; that record, however, has since been surpassed by Taxiarchis Fountas, also for AEK. Against Thrasyvoulos, Tachtsidis scored the winning goal in the 92nd minute to give his team the three points.

Genoa
On 21 April 2010, Tachtsidis completed a move to Italian club Genoa that had already been previously agreed upon in January 2010.

Loans to Cesena, Grosseto and Verona
In August 2010, he was loaned to Cesena with an option to buy half of his registration rights in co-ownership. In February 2011, he was loaned to Grosseto.

In the 2011–12 season, he was loaned to Verona. With Verona, he helped the club reach the play-offs.

Roma

On 19 July 2012, Tachtsidis signed a five-year contract with Roma for a fee of €2.5 million in co-ownership deal (€1.5 million plus 50% registration rights of Andrea Bertolacci). He scored one goal in 21 appearances for the club during the 2012–13 season.

On 20 June 2013, Roma signed Mattia Destro outright for a pre-agreed figure of €4.5 million. Giammario Piscitella and Valerio Verre, who were sent to Genoa as part of the Destro loan deal, returned to Roma for €4 million in total (having cost Genoa €3 million in 2012). As part of this complex deal, Tachtsidis returned to Genoa for €3 million.

Catania
On 20 June 2013, it was announced that Tachtsidis had returned to Genoa, however, less than a month later he was sold in a co-ownership deal to Catania in exchange for the co-ownership of Francesco Lodi. However, he left the club temporarily after 6 months and definitively in June 2014.

Loan to Torino
On 9 January 2014, he was loaned to Torino on loan for the rest of the season. He made his first appearance on 19 January, in a 2–0 away win against Sassuolo. He scored his first goal for the club in a 3–3 away draw against Lazio. On 13 June 2014, Tachtsidis and Lodi returned to Genoa and Catania respectively.

Genoa and loan to Verona
Genoa bought back Tachtsidis on 13 June 2014. On 18 July 2014, he returned to Verona on loan with a buyout option at the end of the season. However, Verona did not buy Tachtsidis; Tachtsidis returned to Genoa at the end of season, making his debut 2 months later.

He made his debut for Genoa on 23 August 2015, away to Palermo, as a 68th minute replacement for Diego Capel. He scored his first goal for the club in a 3–2 win against Chievo Verona.

Return to Torino and loan to Cagliari
On 5 August 2016, he signed a contract with Torino for a fee of reported €1.3 million. However, contradicted to the press release, Torino stated in the 2016 filing that the deal initially a loan.

Less than a month after the signing of his contract with Torino, Cagliari signed Tachtsidis in a temporary deal. On 15 November 2016, Tachtsidis was injured for at least two weeks after an injury on international duty.

Olympiacos
On 30 June 2017, he was signed by Olympiacos. On 19 September 2017, he made his debut with the club in a Greek Cup 2–1 home win game against Asteras Tripolis.
On 7 February 2018, Tachtsidis grabbed a goal back from a set-piece for Oscar Garcia's Olympiacos, but the reds could not find a way back and waved goodbye to a chance of silverware with AEK progressing to the Greek Cup semifinals 2–1 on aggregate after the first leg ended 0–0. It was his first goal with the club.

Nottingham Forest
On 5 September 2018, Tachtsidis signed for EFL Championship side Nottingham Forest on a two-year deal. In December 2018, Tachtsidis completed a loan move to Italian club Lecce. The deal included a clause to make the move permanent the following summer. The Greek midfielder had found his opportunities hugely limited at the City Ground, following his arrival from Olympiacos. The 27-year-old has featured on the bench – but has not had any minutes on the pitch, amid fierce competition for places in Aitor Karanka's squad.

Following his loan spell at Lecce, Tachtsidis was released by Forest.

Lecce
On 3 January 2019, he moved to Serie B side Lecce on loan, with a clause included to make the move permanent in the summer. On 19 January he made his debut with the giallorossi side in a home draw against Benevento in the Serie B. On 11 May 2019, he helped his club in a 2–1 home win against Spezia Calcio and Lecce secured automatic promotion to Serie A. Lecce triggered the buying option at the end of the season.

Al-Fayha
On 16 July 2021, he moved to Saudi Professional League side Al-Fayha.
On 11 August 2021, he was the only scorer, in his first appearance with the club in a home 1–0 win game against Al-Ittihad. On 19 May 2022, he scored the winning penalty (3–1) for Al-Fayha against Al Hilal in the 2022 King Cup Final.

Khor Fakkan
On 30 September 2022, Tachtsidis joined UAE Pro League side Khor Fakkan.

International career
Tachtsidis' exceptional season with both Catania and Torino was his passport not only to be called from Greek national manager Fernando Santos to the 30-man provisional World Cup squad, but also to the final 23-man squad for 2014 FIFA World Cup.

On 30 March 2015, Tachtsidis and Vangelis Moras as well Giannis Fetfatzidis were in a car crash. The three Greek internationals were travelling by taxi to Budapest Airport in Hungary, following a Euro 2016 qualifier. One person was killed in the collision, but the Greek Federation released a statement confirming that the three players were not seriously injured. Three other people were seriously injured in the crash. On 11 October 2015, he scored his first goal with Greece in a 4–3 home win against Hungary when he lashed in a powerful shot.

Style of play
Tachtsidis is a particular type of player that needs to be accommodated into a specific system. Without being particularly athletic, the Greek international more than makes up for this with an exceptional range of passing.

Personal life
He is married to Zeta Theodoropoulou, with whom he has three children.

Career statistics

Club

International goals
Scores and results list Greece's goal tally first, score column indicates score after each Tachtsidis goal.

Honours
AEK Athens
Greek Football Cup runner-up: 2008–09

Al-Fayha
King Cup: 2021–22

References

External links

 
 
 

1991 births
Living people
Greek footballers
Footballers from Nafplion
Greece youth international footballers
Greece under-21 international footballers
Greece international footballers
Association football midfielders
AEK Athens F.C. players
Genoa C.F.C. players
A.C. Cesena players
F.C. Grosseto S.S.D. players
Hellas Verona F.C. players
A.S. Roma players
Catania S.S.D. players
Torino F.C. players
Cagliari Calcio players
Olympiacos F.C. players
Nottingham Forest F.C. players
U.S. Lecce players
Al-Fayha FC players
Khor Fakkan Sports Club players
Super League Greece players
Serie A players
Serie B players
Saudi Professional League players
UAE Pro League players
Greek expatriate footballers
Greek expatriate sportspeople in Italy
Expatriate footballers in Italy
Greek expatriate sportspeople in England
Expatriate footballers in England
Greek expatriate sportspeople in Saudi Arabia
Expatriate footballers in Saudi Arabia
Greek expatriate sportspeople in the United Arab Emirates
Expatriate footballers in the United Arab Emirates
2014 FIFA World Cup players